"Peklo milencov" is a song by Marika Gombitová released on Jumbo Records in 1994.

The composition wrote Gombitová in common with Kamil Peteraj, and was issued as B-side on single "Paradiso", also written by themselves. Both songs were released on the singer's last studio album to date Zostaň (1994).

Official versions
 "Peklo milencov" - Studio version, 1994

Credits and personnel
 Marika Gombitová - music, lead vocal
 Kamil Peteraj - lyrics
 Vašo Patejdl - producer
 Jumbo Records - copyright

References

General

Specific

1994 songs
1994 singles
Marika Gombitová songs
Songs written by Marika Gombitová
Songs written by Kamil Peteraj
Slovak-language songs